First Flight (foaled 1944 in Kentucky) was an American Thoroughbred racehorse who was voted the American Champion Two-Year-Old Filly of 1946

Background
First Flight was bred and raced by Cornelius Vanderbilt Whitney and conditioned for racing by Hall of Fame inductee, Sylvester Veitch.

Racing career
Her first season started in May 1946 where she equaled a Belmont Park track record in winning her racing debut with Arnold Kirkland aboard in the Fashion Stakes. After a "going away" victory in the Astoria Stakes during June, the filly received some time off. She went on to win the Matron Stakes on September 28. 7 days later the filly defeated colts in winning (the then) most prestigious race for juveniles, the Futurity Stakes in October. Ridden by Eddie Arcaro, First Flight beat I Will by one and a half lengths with the future Kentucky Derby winner Jet Pilot in third. In doing so, she became the first filly to win the Futurity since the Whitney-owned Top Flight in 1931. Her 5 for 6 season gained her the Two-Year-Old Filly Championship

At age three, she won two races with her main victory coming in the Monmouth Oaks.

At age four, her major win came against males when she captured the 1948 Fall Highweight Handicap. She won three other races that year to compile a record of 11 wins in 24 lifetime starts.

Pedigree

References

1944 racehorse births
Thoroughbred family 8-c
Racehorses bred in Kentucky
Racehorses trained in the United States
American Champion racehorses
Whitney racehorses